The Romania men's national under-20 basketball team is a national basketball team of Romania, administered by the Romanian Basketball Federation. It represents the country in international men's under-20 basketball competitions.

FIBA U20 European Championship participations

See also
Romania men's national basketball team
Romania men's national under-19 basketball team
Romania women's national under-20 basketball team

References

External links
Archived records of Romania team participations

Basketball in Romania
Basketball
Men's national under-20 basketball teams